Grand Forks City Hall is a building in Grand Forks, North Dakota that was listed on the National Register of Historic Places in 1982.

It was built in 1911.

It was designed by Grand Forks architect John W. Ross and was built by Northern Construction & Engineering.

In a 1981 survey of Downtown Grand Forks historical resources, it was stated this building "is pure Beaux Arts. Rather small in scale and only two storys over a raised basement, the City Hall is faced with ashlar and was similar in mass, style, and materials to the recently razed Carnegie Library which was located nearby."

The listing was for an area of less than one acre with just the one building.

References

External links

City and town halls on the National Register of Historic Places in North Dakota
Government buildings completed in 1911
Beaux-Arts architecture in North Dakota
Historic American Buildings Survey in North Dakota
1911 establishments in North Dakota
National Register of Historic Places in Grand Forks, North Dakota